The Philips PFA Golf Classic was a senior (over 50s) men's professional golf tournament on the European Senior Tour. It was played from 1997 to 1999. In 1998 and 1999 the tournament was held at Meon Valley Country Club, Shedfield, Hampshire, while in 1997 it was held at St Pierre Golf & Country Club, near Chepstow, Wales

Winners

References

Former European Senior Tour events
Golf tournaments in the United Kingdom
Recurring sporting events established in 1997
Recurring sporting events disestablished in 1999
1997 establishments in England
1999 disestablishments in England